Billy Joe Castle (born 14 July 1992 in Marchwood, Hampshire) is an English  professional snooker player.

Career
In May 2017, Castle came through Q-School by winning six matches to earn a two-year card on the World Snooker Tour for the 2017–18 and 2018–19 seasons. Prior to this Castle appeared in the 2015 English Amateur Championship final, losing 6–10 to Michael Rhodes. In 2017 he won the tournament by defeating David Lilley 10–8.

Performance and rankings timeline

Career finals

Amateur finals: 3 (2 titles)

References

External links

Billy Castle at worldsnooker.com

English snooker players
Living people
1992 births
People from New Forest District
Sportspeople from Hampshire